Tobias Blomgren (born 9 July 1992) is a Swedish tennis player.

Blomgren has a career-high ATP singles ranking of World No. 763, achieved on 2 April 2012. He also has a career-high ATP doubles ranking of World No. 876, achieved on 10 November 2014. He has a reached 2 singles finals on the ITF Futures tour, finishing runner-up on both occasions. Additionally, he has reached 4 doubles finals also at the ITF Futures level with a record of 1 win and 3 losses. He won his first and only professional-level title in September 2013 at the Turkey F34 Futures tournament where partnering Dekel Bar of Israel, they defeated Marcus Daniell and Richard Gabb in a third set tie-breaker 2–6, 6–4, [10–8].

Blomgren made his ATP Tour debut at the 2010 Swedish Open held in Båstad. Alongside compatriot Christian Lindell, the pair received a wild card entry into the main doubles draw where they proceeded to lose in the first round to Polish duo Mateusz Kowalczyk and Tomasz Bednarek in 3 sets 6–3, 2–6, [7–10].

ATP Challenger and ITF Futures finals

Singles: 2 (0–2)

Doubles: 4 (1–3)

References

External links
 
 

1992 births
Living people
Swedish male tennis players
21st-century Swedish people